Rhett Floyd Hall (born December 5, 1968) is an American football defensive lineman who played eight seasons in the National Football League for the Tampa Bay Buccaneers, San Francisco 49ers, and Philadelphia Eagles. He played in Super Bowl XXIX for the San Francisco 49ers. He played college football at the University of California at Berkeley and was selected in the sixth round of the 1991 NFL draft.

Hall's son Cade is a defensive lineman for the San Jose State Spartans. In 2020, Cade led the Mountain West Conference in sacks and was named MWC Defensive Player of the Year.

References

1968 births
Living people
California Golden Bears football players
American football defensive linemen
Tampa Bay Buccaneers players
San Francisco 49ers players
Philadelphia Eagles players
People from Morgan Hill, California
Players of American football from San Jose, California
Ed Block Courage Award recipients